Structure-Based Assignment (SBA) is a technique to accelerate the resonance assignment which is a key bottleneck of NMR (Nuclear magnetic resonance) structural biology.  A homologous (similar) protein is used as a template to the target protein in SBA. This template protein provides prior structural information about the target protein and leads to faster resonance assignment . By analogy, in X-ray Crystallography, the molecular replacement technique allows solution of the crystallographic phase problem when a homologous structural model is
known, thereby facilitating rapid structure determination. Some of the SBA algorithms
are CAP which is an RNA assignment algorithm which performs an exhaustive search over
all permutations, MARS which is a program for robust automatic backbone assignment  and Nuclear Vector Replacement (NVR) which is a molecular replacement like approach for SBA of resonances and
sparse Nuclear Overhauser Effect (NOE)'s.

References

Nuclear magnetic resonance